Breen Frazier is a freelance writer best known for his work on the television series Alias, which he began writing for during its second season. Additionally Frazier wrote an Alias prequel novel entitled Infiltration as well as the animated short, Animated Alias: Tribunal, a story set between seasons two and three of Alias. Frazier also wrote the story for the 2004 video game, Alias.

Frazier was a writer and an executive producer for Criminal Minds.

TV credits

Roswell
 1.08 Blood Brother — November 24, 1999
 2.11 To Serve and Protect — January 22, 2001
 2.14 How the Other Half Lives — February 19, 2001

Alias
 2.21 Second Double — May 4, 2003
 3.08 Breaking Point — November 23, 2003
 4.09 A Man of His Word — March 2, 2005
 4.13 Tuesday  March 30, 2005
 4.14 Nightingale — April 6, 2005
 5.03 The Shed — October 13, 2005
 5.11 Maternal Instinct — April 19, 2006

Criminal Minds
 4.09 52 Pickup – November 26, 2008
 4.16 Pleasure Is My Business – February 25, 2009
 5.05 Cradle to Grave – October 21, 2009
 5.12 The Uncanny Valley – January 13, 2010
 5.22 The Internet Is Forever – May 19, 2010
 6.04 Compromising Positions – October 13, 2010
 6.18 Lauren (Part 2) – March 16, 2011
 6.23 Big Sea – May 11, 2011
 7.04 Painless – October 12, 2011
 7.12 Unknown Subject – January 25, 2012
 7.20 The Company – April 11, 2012
 8.04 God Complex – October 24, 2012
 8.12 Zugzwang – January 16, 2013
 8.22 #6 – May 15, 2013
 9.02 The Inspired (Part 2) – October 2, 2013
 9.12 The Black Queen – January 15, 2014
 9.20 Blood Relations – April 2, 2014
 9.23 Angels (Part 1) – May 7, 2014
 10.04 The Itch – October 22, 2014
 10.11 The Forever People – January 14, 2015
 10.21 Mr. Scratch – April 22, 2015
 11.01 The Job – September 30, 2015
 11.11 Entropy – January 13, 2016
 11.16 Derek – March 2, 2016
 11.22 The Storm – May 4, 2016
 12.01 The Crimson King – September 28, 2016
 12.07 Mirror Image – November 16, 2016
 12.22 Red Light (Part 2) – May 10, 2017
 13.01 Wheels Up (Part 3) – September 27, 2017
 13.09 False Flag – December 6, 2017
 13.22 Believer (Part 1) – April 18, 2018
 14.04 The Tall Man – October 31, 2018
 14.13 Chameleon – January 23, 2019
 15.04 Saturday – January 22, 2020
 15.06 Date Night – February 5, 2020

Other credits
 Animated Alias: Tribunal — (2003)
 Infiltration: Alias prequel 9 — (2004)
 Alias - The video game (2004)

External links

Living people
Year of birth missing (living people)
American television writers
American male television writers